Jon Cooper (born October 1, 1986) is an American football coach and former player who is currently the offensive line coach at North Texas. He played in the National Football League (NFL) for the Minnesota Vikings as a center. He played college football at Oklahoma and was signed by the Vikings in 2009.

Early years
Cooper attended Fort Collins High School in Fort Collins, Colorado, where he was a three-year starter and letterman. He captured team MVP honors his senior season and was named Offensive Player of the Year in the Front Range Conference.

College career
Cooper joined the Oklahoma Sooners football team in 2005. He played in eleven games, starting two, for the team as a freshman. In his second start, he suffered a dislocation and break in his right ankle at Texas Tech and missed the remainder of the season. Was one of the most solid true freshmen on the team after posting no penalties and a high passing grade of 83% in OU's stringent grading process.

Was named the starting center his sophomore season in 2006 and posted the second highest grade on the team, with a 79% success rate. Cooper notched 125 knockdown blocks during the course of the season, including 18 against Oklahoma State.

Cooper led one of the nation's best offensive lines in 2007, starting all 14 games and logging team highs with 798 plays and 136 knockdowns. He had 16 knockdowns against Miami and 15 against Texas A&M, with a final grade of 81% for the season.

Professional career

NFL combine results

Minnesota Vikings
Cooper signed a rookie contract with the Minnesota Vikings. He appeared in his first NFL game in week 13 against the Arizona Cardinals at right guard after two additional injuries to the offensive line.

Tennessee Titans
Cooper was signed as a free agent by the Tennessee Titans on April 13, 2012. He retired from the NFL on August 27, 2012.

Coaching career
Following his retirement from the NFL, Cooper joined the coaching staff at Oklahoma as a graduate assistant. In 2016, Cooper joined the staff at Missouri as an offensive analyst. He was named the tight ends coach at Arkansas in 2020.

Personal
Cooper majored in Finance while at Oklahoma. In his free time, he enjoys golfing, and snow skiing. His father Tom played college football for Missouri from 1972 to 1975.

References

External links
 
Arkansas Razorbacks bio
Oklahoma Sooners bio
Combine profile

1986 births
Living people
Sportspeople from Fort Collins, Colorado
American football centers
Players of American football from Colorado
Oklahoma Sooners football players
UCF Knights football coaches
Utah State Aggies football coaches
Minnesota Vikings players
Oklahoma Sooners football coaches
Arkansas Razorbacks football coaches